Henry James Tufton, 11th Earl of Thanet (2 January 1775 – 12 June 1849) was a peer in the peerage of England and a noted English cricketer of the 1790s.

Biography
Henry Tufton belonged to an aristocratic family that was prominent in cricketing and other sporting circles. His parents were Sackville Tufton, 8th Earl of Thanet (1733–1786), and Mary Sackville (1746–1778), who was the daughter of Lord John Philip Sackville and the sister of John Frederick Sackville, 3rd Duke of Dorset. Sackville and Dorset were famous patrons of Kent cricket. One of Tufton's older brothers was the Honourable John Tufton (1773–1799), who was also a noted amateur cricketer. Henry Tufton succeeded his elder brother Charles Tufton, 10th Earl of Thanet as 11th Earl of Thanet in April 1832. He served as hereditary High Sheriff of Westmorland from 1832 until his own death. He was member of parliament (MP) for Rochester 1796–1802, for Appleby 1826–1832. He was Lord Lieutenant of Kent 1841–1846.

Cricket career
Tufton was a wicketkeeper-batsman who is believed to have been right-handed and made his debut in important matches for Surrey and Sussex in a game against All-England at the original Lord's Cricket Ground in June 1793. Arthur Haygarth in Scores and Biographies said of Tufton that he "was a successful batsman and wicket-keeper during his short career, which terminated when he was only twenty-six years of age. In the match between the Marylebone Club against the Thursday and Montpelier on 13 July 1796, he stumped six and caught two". In all, Henry Tufton played in 77 important matches until July 1801. His final game was for Marylebone Cricket Club (MCC) versus Homerton Cricket Club at the original Lord's Cricket Ground.

Haygarth adds that when Tufton "was travelling in France in 1803, he was seized on Napoleon's orders (along with the rest of the English) as a prisoner; nor did he on his return to England resume the game [of cricket]. He was at one time member of Parliament for Rochester".

Private life
Henry Tufton did not marry and was the last of the Earls of Thanet. He was buried in the family vault at Rainham Church in Kent. Haygarth says he had no monument and only an inscription on his coffin that stated in 1849:

HENRY TUFTON,
Earl of Thanet,
Hereditary High Sheriff of the county of Westmorland,
Late Lord Lieutenant of Kent,
Died June 12, 1849
IN THE 75TH YEAR OF HIS AGE

References

 Fresh Light on 18th Century Cricket by G B Buckley (FL18)
 Scores & Biographies, Volume 1 by Arthur Haygarth (SBnnn)

External links
 CricketArchive

Thanet, Henry Tufton, 11th Earl of
Thanet, Henry Tufton, 11th Earl of
English cricketers
English cricketers of 1787 to 1825
Thanet, Henry Tufton, 11th Earl of
Marylebone Cricket Club cricketers
Surrey cricketers
Kent cricketers
Middlesex cricketers
Members of the Parliament of Great Britain for English constituencies
Members of the Parliament of the United Kingdom for English constituencies
UK MPs 1801–1802
UK MPs 1826–1830
UK MPs 1830–1831
UK MPs 1831–1832
UK MPs who inherited peerages
British MPs 1796–1800
High Sheriffs of Westmorland
Surrey and Marylebone Cricket Club cricketers
Earls of Thanet
Recipients of payments from the Slavery Abolition Act 1833
Middlesex and Marylebone Cricket Club cricketers